The 1975 Pittsburgh Pirates season was the 94th in the history of the franchise and their 89th in the National League.  The Pirates' 92–69 record was good enough to win their fifth National League East title in six seasons by 6 games over their cross-state rivals, the Philadelphia Phillies.  The Pirates, however, lost the National League Championship Series to the Cincinnati Reds, three games to none.

Offseason 
 October 22, 1974: Gene Clines was traded by the Pirates to the New York Mets for Duffy Dyer.
 January 6, 1975: Nelson Norman was signed as an amateur free agent by the Pirates.
 February 20, 1975: Albert Williams was signed as an amateur free agent by the Pirates.

Regular season

Season standings

Record vs. opponents

Game log

|- bgcolor="ccffcc"
| 1 || April 10 || @ Cubs || 8–4 || Giusti (1–0) || Frailing || — || 19,239 || 1–0
|- bgcolor="ccffcc"
| 2 || April 11 || Mets || 4–3 || Demery (1–0) || Baldwin || — || 43,880 || 2–0
|- bgcolor="ccffcc"
| 3 || April 13 || Mets || 5–3 || Kison (1–0) || Seaver || — || 14,841 || 3–0
|- bgcolor="ffbbbb"
| 4 || April 14 || Cubs || 2–4 || Reuschel || Moose (0–1) || Knowles || 4,780 || 3–1
|- bgcolor="ffbbbb"
| 5 || April 16 || Expos || 0–5 || Fryman || Ellis (0–1) || — || 4,807 || 3–2
|- bgcolor="ffbbbb"
| 6 || April 17 || Expos || 4–7 || McNally || Reuss (0–1) || — || 5,667 || 3–3
|- bgcolor="ffbbbb"
| 7 || April 18 || @ Cardinals || 4–5 (13) || Sadecki || McDowell (0–1) || — || 19,975 || 3–4
|- bgcolor="ccffcc"
| 8 || April 19 || @ Cardinals || 7–1 || Rooker (1–0) || Forsch || — || 19,775 || 4–4
|- bgcolor="ccffcc"
| 9 || April 20 || @ Cardinals || 5–0 || Brett (1–0) || Denny || Giusti (1) || 20,935 || 5–4
|- bgcolor="ffbbbb"
| 10 || April 22 || @ Expos || 3–4 || McNally || Ellis (0–2) || Murray || 5,239 || 5–5
|- bgcolor="ffbbbb"
| 11 || April 23 || @ Expos || 0–5 || Fryman || Reuss (0–2) || — || 8,177 || 5–6
|- bgcolor="ccffcc"
| 12 || April 25 || Phillies || 3–2 || Kison (2–0) || Carlton || Giusti (2) || 5,726 || 6–6
|- bgcolor="ccffcc"
| 13 || April 26 || Phillies || 7–3 || Rooker (2–0) || Twitchell || — || 13,120 || 7–6
|- bgcolor="ccffcc"
| 14 || April 27 || Phillies || 2–0 || Ellis (1–2) || Underwood || — || 14,074 || 8–6
|- bgcolor="ffbbbb"
| 15 || April 29 || Cardinals || 0–3 || McGlothen || Brett (1–1) || — || 6,319 || 8–7
|- bgcolor="ccffcc"
| 16 || April 30 || Cardinals || 5–0 || Reuss (1–2) || Gibson || — || 5,584 || 9–7
|-

|- bgcolor="ffbbbb"
| 17 || May 2 || @ Phillies || 5–9 || Twitchell || Kison (2–1) || McGraw || 20,257 || 9–8
|- bgcolor="ffbbbb"
| 18 || May 3 || @ Phillies || 2–6 || Underwood || Rooker (2–1) || Garber || — || 9–9
|- bgcolor="ffbbbb"
| 19 || May 3 || @ Phillies || 3–4 (11) || McGraw || Hernandez (0–1) || — || 44,501 || 9–10
|- bgcolor="ccffcc"
| 20 || May 6 || @ Mets || 2–1 (8) || Brett (2–1) || Seaver || — || 8,257 || 10–10
|- bgcolor="ccffcc"
| 21 || May 7 || @ Mets || 6–1 || Reuss (2–2) || Matlack || — || 12,216 || 11–10
|- bgcolor="ccffcc"
| 22 || May 8 || @ Mets || 4–2 || Kison (3–1) || Koosman || — || 14,053 || 12–10
|- bgcolor="ccffcc"
| 23 || May 9 || Dodgers || 11–3 || Ellis (2–2) || Marshall || Giusti (3) || 16,378 || 13–10
|- bgcolor="ffbbbb"
| 24 || May 10 || Dodgers || 2–6 || Rau || Rooker (2–2) || — || 24,870 || 13–11
|- bgcolor="ffbbbb"
| 25 || May 11 || Dodgers || 0–7 || Sutton || Brett (2–2) || — || 15,175 || 13–12
|- bgcolor="ccffcc"
| 26 || May 13 || Padres || 2–0 || Reuss (3–2) || Spillner || — || 5,482 || 14–12
|- bgcolor="ccffcc"
| 27 || May 14 || Padres || 5–4 (11) || McDowell (1–1) || Greif || — || 8,334 || 15–12
|- bgcolor="ccffcc"
| 28 || May 16 || @ Dodgers || 3–2 || Giusti (2–0) || Sutton || — || 44,111 || 16–12
|- bgcolor="ffbbbb"
| 29 || May 17 || @ Dodgers || 3–4 (10) || Messersmith || Hernandez (0–2) || — || 46,790 || 16–13
|- bgcolor="ccffcc"
| 30 || May 18 || @ Dodgers || 7–2 || Brett (3–2) || Hooton || — || 42,013 || 17–13
|- bgcolor="ffbbbb"
| 31 || May 19 || @ Giants || 4–6 || Caldwell || Reuss (3–3) || — || 1,795 || 17–14
|- bgcolor="ffbbbb"
| 32 || May 20 || @ Giants || 4–12 || Halicki || Ellis (2–3) || — || 1,759 || 17–15
|- bgcolor="ffbbbb"
| 33 || May 21 || @ Giants || 1–2 (11) || Barr || Giusti (2–1) || — || 3,513 || 17–16
|- bgcolor="ccffcc"
| 34 || May 22 || @ Padres || 4–2 || Rooker (3–2) || Freisleben || Giusti (4) || 9,148 || 18–16
|- bgcolor="ffbbbb"
| 35 || May 23 || @ Padres || 3–4 || Frisella || Giusti (2–2) || — || 14,858 || 18–17
|- bgcolor="ffbbbb"
| 36 || May 24 || @ Padres || 0–5 || Jones || Reuss (3–4) || — || 22,758 || 18–18
|- bgcolor="ccffcc"
| 37 || May 25 || @ Padres || 6–5 (11) || Hernandez (1–2) || Frisella || Demery (1) || 28,778 || 19–18
|- bgcolor="ccffcc"
| 38 || May 26 || Astros || 10–2 || Kison (4–1) || Richard || — || 11,126 || 20–18
|- bgcolor="ccffcc"
| 39 || May 27 || Astros || 6–5 || Demery (2–0) || Niekro || — || 7,003 || 21–18
|- bgcolor="ccffcc"
| 40 || May 28 || Astros || 3–0 || Brett (4–2) || Roberts || — || 7,601 || 22–18
|- bgcolor="ccffcc"
| 41 || May 30 || Braves || 2–1 || Reuss (4–4) || Capra || — || 11,565 || 23–18
|- bgcolor="ccffcc"
| 42 || May 31 || Braves || 11–4 || Kison (5–1) || Harrison || — || 13,423 || 24–18
|-

|- bgcolor="ffbbbb"
| 43 || June 1 || Braves || 2–5 || Niekro || Rooker (3–3) || — || 37,373 || 24–19
|- bgcolor="ffbbbb"
| 44 || June 3 || Reds || 4–8 || Nolan || Moose (0–2) || — || 9,438 || 24–20
|- bgcolor="ccffcc"
| 45 || June 4 || Reds || 2–1 || Reuss (5–4) || Norman || Hernandez (1) || 13,754 || 25–20
|- bgcolor="ccffcc"
| 46 || June 6 || Giants || 7–2 || Kison (6–1) || Barr || — || 11,923 || 26–20
|- bgcolor="ccffcc"
| 47 || June 7 || Giants || 7–6 || Hernandez (2–2) || Toms || Giusti (5) || 8,668 || 27–20
|- bgcolor="ffbbbb"
| 48 || June 8 || Giants || 1–3 || Halicki || Candelaria (0–1) || — || — || 27–21
|- bgcolor="ffbbbb"
| 49 || June 8 || Giants || 2–4 || Lavelle || Demery (2–1) || Moffitt || 24,128 || 27–22
|- bgcolor="ccffcc"
| 50 || June 9 || @ Reds || 9–2 || Reuss (6–4) || Norman || — || 22,555 || 28–22
|- bgcolor="ccffcc"
| 51 || June 10 || @ Reds || 9–5 || McDowell (2–1) || Darcy || Hernandez (2) || 19,107 || 29–22
|- bgcolor="ffbbbb"
| 52 || June 11 || @ Astros || 1–5 || Dierker || Kison (6–2) || — || 10,125 || 29–23
|- bgcolor="ccffcc"
| 53 || June 12 || @ Astros || 4–2 || Ellis (3–3) || Roberts || Demery (2) || 10,802 || 30–23
|- bgcolor="ccffcc"
| 54 || June 13 || @ Braves || 8–3 || Rooker (4–3) || Odom || — || 8,998 || 31–23
|- bgcolor="ccffcc"
| 55 || June 14 || @ Braves || 2–1 || Reuss (7–4) || Thompson || Giusti (6) || 29,308 || 32–23
|- bgcolor="ccffcc"
| 56 || June 15 || @ Braves || 8–6 || Demery (3–1) || Sosa || — || 8,352 || 33–23
|- bgcolor="ccffcc"
| 57 || June 16 || Cardinals || 10–4 || Kison (7–2) || Bryant || — || 13,003 || 34–23
|- bgcolor="ffbbbb"
| 58 || June 17 || Cardinals || 4–7 || McGlothen || Ellis (3–4) || Garman || 15,898 || 34–24
|- bgcolor="ccffcc"
| 59 || June 18 || Cardinals || 9–3 || Rooker (5–3) || Reed || — || 22,345 || 35–24
|- bgcolor="ccffcc"
| 60 || June 19 || Cardinals || 5–0 || Reuss (8–4) || Curtis || — || 8,198 || 36–24
|- bgcolor="ccffcc"
| 61 || June 20 || @ Mets || 5–1 || Candelaria (1–1) || Hall || — || 47,867 || 37–24
|- bgcolor="ccffcc"
| 62 || June 21 || @ Mets || 7–3 || Hernandez (3–2) || Parker || — || 31,610 || 38–24
|- bgcolor="ccffcc"
| 63 || June 22 || @ Mets || 2–0 || Ellis (4–4) || Tate || — || 34,287 || 39–24
|- bgcolor="ffbbbb"
| 64 || June 23 || @ Phillies || 5–6 || Hilgendorf || Demery (3–2) || Garber || 34,759 || 39–25
|- bgcolor="ffbbbb"
| 65 || June 24 || @ Phillies || 3–6 || Christenson || Reuss (8–5) || McGraw || — || 39–26
|- bgcolor="ffbbbb"
| 66 || June 24 || @ Phillies || 1–8 || Underwood || Kison (7–3) || — || 50,463 || 39–27
|- bgcolor="ffbbbb"
| 67 || June 25 || @ Phillies || 6–7 (13) || Schueler || Giusti (2–3) || — || 34,171 || 39–28
|- bgcolor="ccffcc"
| 68 || June 26 || Cubs || 5–2 || Candelaria (2–1) || Frailing || — || 10,394 || 40–28
|- bgcolor="ccffcc"
| 69 || June 27 || Cubs || 5–1 || Ellis (5–4) || Zahn || — || — || 41–28
|- bgcolor="ccffcc"
| 70 || June 27 || Cubs || 5–3 || Hernandez (4–2) || Knowles || Giusti (7) || 34,972 || 42–28
|- bgcolor="ffbbbb"
| 71 || June 28 || Cubs || 0–1 || Bonham || Rooker (5–4) || — || 16,477 || 42–29
|- bgcolor="ccffcc"
| 72 || June 29 || Cubs || 4–3 || Giusti (3–3) || Reuschel || — || — || 43–29
|- bgcolor="ccffcc"
| 73 || June 29 || Cubs || 7–0 || Reuss (9–5) || Dettore || — || 37,145 || 44–29
|- bgcolor="ccffcc"
| 74 || June 30 || @ Expos || 5–3 || Demery (4–2) || Blair || Tekulve (1) || 13,134 || 45–29
|-

|- bgcolor="ccffcc"
| 75 || July 1 || @ Expos || 10–4 || Candelaria (3–1) || Fryman || — || 15,132 || 46–29
|- bgcolor="ccffcc"
| 76 || July 3 || @ Expos || 5–1 || Ellis (6–4) || Rogers || — || 10,116 || 47–29
|- bgcolor="ffbbbb"
| 77 || July 4 || @ Cubs || 1–6 || Stone || Kison (7–4) || — || — || 47–30
|- bgcolor="ffbbbb"
| 78 || July 4 || @ Cubs || 1–2 (11) || Knowles || Reuss (9–6) || — || 30,355 || 47–31
|- bgcolor="ccffcc"
| 79 || July 5 || @ Cubs || 5–4 || Rooker (6–4) || Burris || Hernandez (3) || 22,393 || 48–31
|- bgcolor="ccffcc"
| 80 || July 6 || @ Cubs || 18–12 || Hernandez (5–2) || Frailing || — || 28,023 || 49–31
|- bgcolor="ccffcc"
| 81 || July 7 || @ Cubs || 5–0 || Brett (5–2) || Reuschel || Giusti (8) || 16,540 || 50–31
|- bgcolor="ffbbbb"
| 82 || July 8 || Dodgers || 0–3 || Sutton || Ellis (6–5) || Marshall || 29,376 || 50–32
|- bgcolor="ccffcc"
| 83 || July 9 || Dodgers || 3–2 || Kison (8–4) || Messersmith || Giusti (9) || 22,163 || 51–32
|- bgcolor="ccffcc"
| 84 || July 10 || Dodgers || 4–1 || Reuss (10–6) || Hooton || Giusti (10) || 18,521 || 52–32
|- bgcolor="ccffcc"
| 85 || July 11 || Padres || 6–2 || Rooker (7–4) || Folkers || Giusti (11) || — || 53–32
|- bgcolor="ccffcc"
| 86 || July 11 || Padres || 5–0 || Candelaria (4–1) || McIntosh || — || 31,435 || 54–32
|- bgcolor="ccffcc"
| 87 || July 12 || Padres || 6–4 || Hernandez (6–2) || Jones || Demery (3) || 21,877 || 55–32
|- bgcolor="ffbbbb"
| 88 || July 13 || Padres || 5–7 || Strom || Ellis (6–6) || Spillner || 20,113 || 55–33
|- bgcolor="ccffcc"
| 89 || July 17 || @ Dodgers || 5–2 || Kison (9–4) || Messersmith || Giusti (12) || 32,806 || 56–33
|- bgcolor="ffbbbb"
| 90 || July 18 || @ Dodgers || 3–4 || Marshall || Demery (4–3) || — || 52,506 || 56–34
|- bgcolor="ccffcc"
| 91 || July 19 || @ Dodgers || 5–3 || Giusti (4–3) || Marshall || — || 51,591 || 57–34
|- bgcolor="ffbbbb"
| 92 || July 20 || @ Giants || 1–2 || Halicki || Rooker (7–5) || — || — || 57–35
|- bgcolor="ccffcc"
| 93 || July 20 || @ Giants || 7–1 || Brett (6–2) || Caldwell || — || 14,723 || 58–35
|- bgcolor="ffbbbb"
| 94 || July 21 || @ Giants || 2–7 || Barr || Candelaria (4–2) || — || 3,417 || 58–36
|- bgcolor="ffbbbb"
| 95 || July 22 || @ Padres || 0–1 || Jones || Kison (9–5) || — || 14,437 || 58–37
|- bgcolor="ccffcc"
| 96 || July 23 || @ Padres || 8–1 || Ellis (7–6) || Freisleben || — || 14,547 || 59–37
|- bgcolor="ccffcc"
| 97 || July 25 || Expos || 6–1 || Reuss (11–6) || DeMola || — || 20,124 || 60–37
|- bgcolor="ffbbbb"
| 98 || July 26 || Expos || 2–5 || Rogers || Rooker (7–6) || — || 4,394 || 60–38
|- bgcolor="ccffcc"
| 99 || July 27 || Expos || 4–1 || Brett (7–2) || Scherman || Demery (4) || — || 61–38
|- bgcolor="ccffcc"
| 100 || July 27 || Expos || 5–3 || Giusti (5–3) || Warthen || — || 27,961 || 62–38
|- bgcolor="ffbbbb"
| 101 || July 28 || Phillies || 2–5 || Christenson || Kison (9–6) || — || 30,221 || 62–39
|- bgcolor="ffbbbb"
| 102 || July 29 || Phillies || 1–5 || Underwood || Ellis (7–7) || — || 33,340 || 62–40
|- bgcolor="ccffcc"
| 103 || July 30 || Phillies || 8–1 || Reuss (12–6) || Carlton || — || 43,260 || 63–40
|- bgcolor="ffbbbb"
| 104 || July 31 || Mets || 2–6 || Koosman || Rooker (7–7) || — || 13,235 || 63–41
|-

|- bgcolor="ffbbbb"
| 105 || August 1 || Mets || 2–4 || Stone || Brett (7–3) || Apodaca || 18,082 || 63–42
|- bgcolor="ffbbbb"
| 106 || August 2 || Mets || 0–6 || Matlack || Kison (9–7) || — || 14,306 || 63–43
|- bgcolor="ccffcc"
| 107 || August 3 || Mets || 5–4 (15) || Demery (5–3) || Apodaca || — || — || 64–43
|- bgcolor="ccffcc"
| 108 || August 3 || Mets || 4–3 || Candelaria (5–2) || Webb || — || 30,070 || 65–43
|- bgcolor="ffbbbb"
| 109 || August 4 || @ Cardinals || 4–5 || Curtis || Reuss (12–7) || Hrabosky || 28,097 || 65–44
|- bgcolor="ccffcc"
| 110 || August 5 || @ Cardinals || 6–1 || Rooker (8–7) || Rasmussen || — || 25,489 || 66–44
|- bgcolor="ffbbbb"
| 111 || August 6 || @ Cardinals || 2–4 || Denny || Brett (7–4) || Hrabosky || 23,985 || 66–45
|- bgcolor="ffbbbb"
| 112 || August 7 || @ Astros || 1–6 || Roberts || Kison (9–8) || — || 15,255 || 66–46
|- bgcolor="ffbbbb"
| 113 || August 8 || @ Astros || 3–5 || Crawford || Tekulve (0–1) || — || 14,889 || 66–47
|- bgcolor="ffbbbb"
| 114 || August 9 || @ Astros || 0–5 || Niekro || Reuss (12–8) || — || 13,531 || 66–48
|- bgcolor="ffbbbb"
| 115 || August 10 || @ Astros || 3–5 || Richard || Rooker (8–8) || Cosgrove || 12,243 || 66–49
|- bgcolor="ccffcc"
| 116 || August 11 || @ Braves || 8–1 || Candelaria (6–2) || Easterly || Tekulve (2) || 4,701 || 67–49
|- bgcolor="ffbbbb"
| 117 || August 12 || @ Braves || 2–3 || Morton || Kison (9–9) || House || 4,506 || 67–50
|- bgcolor="ffbbbb"
| 118 || August 13 || @ Braves || 3–4 || House || Brett (7–5) || — || 4,163 || 67–51
|- bgcolor="ffbbbb"
| 119 || August 14 || @ Reds || 1–6 || Nolan || Reuss (12–9) || — || 40,062 || 67–52
|- bgcolor="ffbbbb"
| 120 || August 15 || @ Reds || 3–8 || Norman || Rooker (8–9) || — || 45,003 || 67–53
|- bgcolor="ffbbbb"
| 121 || August 16 || @ Reds || 3–5 || Billingham || Candelaria (6–3) || Eastwick || 51,286 || 67–54
|- bgcolor="ffbbbb"
| 122 || August 17 || @ Reds || 1–3 || Darcy || Kison (9–10) || Eastwick || 50,121 || 67–55
|- bgcolor="ccffcc"
| 123 || August 19 || Giants || 4–0 || Reuss (13–9) || Barr || — || 22,609 || 68–55
|- bgcolor="ccffcc"
| 124 || August 20 || Giants || 3–1 || Rooker (9–9) || Halicki || Giusti (13) || 14,033 || 69–55
|- bgcolor="ccffcc"
| 125 || August 22 || Reds || 7–2 || Demery (6–3) || Billingham || — || — || 70–55
|- bgcolor="ccffcc"
| 126 || August 22 || Reds || 4–2 || Candelaria (7–3) || McEnaney || Giusti (14) || 46,576 || 71–55
|- bgcolor="ffbbbb"
| 127 || August 23 || Reds || 7–12 || Kirby || Kison (9–11) || Eastwick || 32,068 || 71–56
|- bgcolor="ccffcc"
| 128 || August 24 || Reds || 5–1 || Reuss (14–9) || Nolan || — || 35,598 || 72–56
|- bgcolor="ccffcc"
| 129 || August 25 || Braves || 4–0 || Rooker (10–9) || Thompson || — || 11,146 || 73–56
|- bgcolor="ccffcc"
| 130 || August 26 || Braves || 8–2 || Demery (7–3) || Easterly || — || 12,213 || 74–56
|- bgcolor="ffbbbb"
| 131 || August 27 || Braves || 2–6 || Niekro || Candelaria (7–4) || — || 21,209 || 74–57
|- bgcolor="ffbbbb"
| 132 || August 30 || Astros || 4–7 || Dierker || Reuss (14–10) || — || 13,473 || 74–58
|- bgcolor="ccffcc"
| 133 || August 31 || Astros || 9–6 || Kison (10–11) || Sosa || Giusti (15) || 14,507 || 75–58
|-

|- bgcolor="ffbbbb"
| 134 || September 1 || @ Mets || 0–3 || Seaver || Candelaria (7–5) || — || 45,991 || 75–59
|- bgcolor="ccffcc"
| 135 || September 2 || @ Mets || 8–4 || Tekulve (1–1) || Koosman || Giusti (16) || 26,486 || 76–59
|- bgcolor="ccffcc"
| 136 || September 3 || @ Mets || 3–1 || Reuss (15–10) || Matlack || — || 27,599 || 77–59
|- bgcolor="ffbbbb"
| 137 || September 5 || @ Expos || 3–4 (10) || Taylor || Tekulve (1–2) || — || — || 77–60
|- bgcolor="ccffcc"
| 138 || September 5 || @ Expos || 5–2 || Rooker (11–9) || Renko || Hernandez (4) || 15,130 || 78–60
|- bgcolor="ccffcc"
| 139 || September 6 || @ Expos || 12–5 (11) || Brett (8–5) || Murray || — || 10,206 || 79–60
|- bgcolor="ccffcc"
| 140 || September 7 || @ Expos || 6–0 || Reuss (16–10) || Blair || — || 14,041 || 80–60
|- bgcolor="ccffcc"
| 141 || September 8 || Cubs || 4–1 || Ellis (8–7) || Prall || Hernandez (5) || 6,756 || 81–60
|- bgcolor="ffbbbb"
| 142 || September 9 || Cubs || 5–6 || Bonham || Demery (7–4) || Reuschel || 7,346 || 81–61
|- bgcolor="ccffcc"
| 143 || September 10 || Mets || 8–4 || Rooker (12–9) || Seaver || — || 11,988 || 82–61
|- bgcolor="ffbbbb"
| 144 || September 11 || Mets || 0–7 || Koosman || Reuss (16–11) || — || 4,762 || 82–62
|- bgcolor="ccffcc"
| 145 || September 12 || Expos || 6–3 || Moose (1–2) || Carrithers || — || 9,449 || 83–62
|- bgcolor="ffbbbb"
| 146 || September 13 || Expos || 2–5 || Warthen || Ellis (8–8) || Fryman || 17,310 || 83–63
|- bgcolor="ccffcc"
| 147 || September 14 || Expos || 4–3 || Hernandez (7–2) || Fryman || Giusti (17) || 12,335 || 84–63
|- bgcolor="ffbbbb"
| 148 || September 15 || @ Cubs || 5–6 || Knowles || Giusti (5–4) || — || — || 84–64
|- bgcolor="ccffcc"
| 149 || September 15 || @ Cubs || 9–1 || Rooker (13–9) || Prall || — || 5,432 || 85–64
|- bgcolor="ccffcc"
| 150 || September 16 || @ Cubs || 22–0 || Candelaria (8–5) || Reuschel || — || 4,932 || 86–64
|- bgcolor="ccffcc"
| 151 || September 17 || @ Phillies || 9–1 || Kison (11–11) || Underwood || — || 38,085 || 87–64
|- bgcolor="ffbbbb"
| 152 || September 18 || @ Phillies || 1–4 || Carlton || Ellis (8–9) || — || 27,093 || 87–65
|- bgcolor="ccffcc"
| 153 || September 19 || Cardinals || 7–1 || Brett (9–5) || Denny || — || 19,671 || 88–65
|- bgcolor="ffbbbb"
| 154 || September 20 || Cardinals || 2–8 || Rasmussen || Rooker (13–10) || Hrabosky || 13,493 || 88–66
|- bgcolor="ccffcc"
| 155 || September 21 || Cardinals || 5–3 || Reuss (17–11) || Garman || Tekulve (3) || 35,648 || 89–66
|- bgcolor="ccffcc"
| 156 || September 22 || Phillies || 11–3 || Kison (12–11) || Underwood || Tekulve (4) || 13,176 || 90–66
|- bgcolor="ccffcc"
| 157 || September 23 || Phillies || 3–1 || Moose (2–2) || Carlton || — || 6,445 || 91–66
|- bgcolor="ffbbbb"
| 158 || September 24 || Phillies || 1–8 || Christenson || Demery (7–5) || — || 6,253 || 91–67
|- bgcolor="ffbbbb"
| 159 || September 26 || @ Cardinals || 0–1 || Forsch || Rooker (13–11) || — || 23,496 || 91–68
|- bgcolor="ccffcc"
| 160 || September 27 || @ Cardinals || 4–2 || Reuss (18–11) || McGlothen || Tekulve (5) || 19,180 || 92–68
|- bgcolor="ffbbbb"
| 161 || September 28 || @ Cardinals || 2–6 || Reed || Candelaria (8–6) || — || 20,909 || 92–69
|-

|-
| Legend:       = Win       = LossBold = Pirates team member

Detailed records

Opening Day lineup

Notable transactions 
 April 2, 1975: Sam McDowell was signed as a free agent by the Pirates.
 June 3, 1975: Ernie Camacho was drafted by the Pirates in the 12th round of the 1975 Major League Baseball draft, but did not sign.
 June 26, 1975: Sam McDowell was released by the Pirates.
 July 30, 1975: Paul Popovich was released by the Pirates.

Roster

Player stats

Batting

Starters by position 
Note: Pos = Position; G = Games played; AB = At bats; H = Hits; Avg. = Batting average; HR = Home runs; RBI = Runs batted in

Other batters 
Note: G = Games played; AB = At bats; H = Hits; Avg. = Batting average; HR = Home runs; RBI = Runs batted in

Pitching

Starting pitchers 
Note: G = Games pitched; IP = Innings pitched; W = Wins; L = Losses; ERA = Earned run average; SO = Strikeouts

Other pitchers 
Note: G = Games pitched; IP = Innings pitched; W = Wins; L = Losses; ERA = Earned run average; SO = Strikeouts

Relief pitchers 
Note: G = Games pitched; W = Wins; L = Losses; SV = Saves; ERA = Earned run average; SO = Strikeouts

National League Championship Series 

The Cincinnati Reds defeated the Pittsburgh Pirates, 3 games to 0.

Awards and honors 

1975 Major League Baseball All-Star Game

Farm system

Notes

References 
 1975 Pittsburgh Pirates at Baseball Reference
 1975 Pittsburgh Pirates at Baseball Almanac

Pittsburgh Pirates seasons
Pittsburgh Pirates season
National League East champion seasons
Pittsburg